Huntington Township is a rural township in Adams County, Pennsylvania, United States. The population was 2,369 at the 2010 census.

History
Huntington Township is the oldest township in Adams County. It was founded in 1745. Latimore Township was formed out of Huntington Township in 1807.  The Borough of York Springs was separated from Huntington in 1868, and was a business, social and religious center for Huntington for centuries.

Since the Civil War, Huntington Township has been a Republican stronghold due largely to its social conservatism and rural character.  Republican candidates for office regularly obtain over 80% of the popular vote in general elections.

The currently serving township supervisors are David Boyer (Chairman), Paul Guise (Vice Chairman), and Mark Leer.

Geography

Recreation
Portions of the Pennsylvania State Game Lands Number 249 is located in Huntington Township.

Demographics

As of the census of 2010, there were 2,369 people, 895 households, and 678 families residing in the township.  The population density was 94.4 people per square mile (36.5/km).  There were 966 housing units at an average density of 38.5/sq mi (14.9/km). The racial makeup of the township was 95.44% White, 0.46% African American, 0.42% Native American, 0.76% Asian, 1.65% some other race, and 1.27% from two or more races. Hispanic or Latino of any race were 5.7% of the population.

There were 895 households, out of which 33.0% had children under the age of 18 living with them, 64.0% were headed by married couples living together, 6.4% had a female householder with no husband present, and 24.2% were non-families. 18.7% of all households were made up of individuals, and 8.0% were someone living alone who was 65 years of age or older. The average household size was 2.65, and the average family size was 3.01.

In the township the population was spread out, with 23.4% under the age of 18, 7.3% from 18 to 24, 24.9% from 25 to 44, 29.7% from 45 to 64, and 14.6% who were 65 years of age or older. The median age was 41.3 years. For every 100 females, there were 101.3 males. For every 100 females age 18 and over, there were 102.7 males.

For the period 2007–2011, the estimated median annual income for a household in the township was $53,657, and the median income for a family was $58,846. Male full-time $23,353. About 2.7% of families and 5.4% of the population were below the poverty line.

References

Populated places established in 1734
Townships in Adams County, Pennsylvania
Townships in Pennsylvania